S. V. Thirugnana Sambandam is an Indian politician and former Member of the Legislative Assembly of Tamil Nadu. He was elected to the Tamil Nadu legislative assembly as a Tamil Maanila Congress (Moopanar) candidate from Peravurani constituency in the 1996 and 2001 elections.

References 

Living people
Tamil Maanila Congress politicians
Tamil Nadu MLAs 1996–2001
Tamil Nadu MLAs 2001–2006
Year of birth missing (living people)